Veterans Day is the tenth studio album by American rapper MC Eiht. It was released on September 28, 2004, via Native Records. Production was handled by Tha Boomdocz, Tha Chill, Prodeje, with co-production by MC Eiht himself, who also served as executive producer together with Kenneth M. Smith. It features guest appearances from Tha Chill. The album peaked at number 70 on the Billboard Top R&B/Hip-Hop Albums chart in the United States.

Track listing

Personnel
Aaron "MC Eiht" Tyler – vocals, co-producer (tracks: 2, 8, 11, 13), executive producer
Vernon "Tha Chill" Johnson – vocals (tracks: 5, 11, 12), producer (tracks: 1-9, 11-16)
Tha Boomdocz – producers (tracks: 1-9, 11-16)
Austin "Prodeje" Patterson – producer (track 10)
David "Rhythm D" Weldon – mixing
Hector Delgado – mixing
Geoff Gibbs – mixing
Bob Lanzner – mastering
Bill Dooley – mastering
Kenneth M. Smith – executive producer
Donald Baker – art direction

Charts

References

2005 albums
MC Eiht albums
Albums produced by MC Eiht
Albums produced by Prodeje